Lenny Martinez (born 11 July 2003) is a French professional racing cyclist, who currently rides for UCI WorldTeam . He is the son, grandson and nephew of former racing cyclists Miguel, Mariano and Yannick Martinez respectively.

Career
On 16 July 2022 during stage 4 of the Giro della Valle d'Aosta Martinez along with teammate Reuben Thompson were the last men standing from the group of favorites. So Martinez who had just extrended his lead in the lead gave the win to Thompson.
On 3 August 2022  confirmed they had signed Martinez into their UCI WorldTeam for 2023.

Major results

Sources:
2021
 1st  Overall Giro della Lunigiana
1st Stage 3
 3rd Overall Ain Bugey Valromey Tour
 National Junior Road Championships
3rd Road race
3rd Time trial
 3rd  Road race, UEC European Junior Road Championships
 3rd Classique des Alpes
2022
 1st  Overall Giro della Valle d'Aosta
1st  Young rider classification
 Ronde de l'Isard
1st  Mountains classification
1st Stages 4 & 6
 3rd Overall Giro Ciclistico d'Italia
1st  Mountains classification
1st  Young rider classification 
 8th Overall Tour de l'Avenir
 8th Mercan'Tour Classic
2023
 8th Grand Prix La Marseillaise

References

External links

2003 births
Living people
French male cyclists